The National Firearms Act (NFA), 73rd Congress, Sess. 2, ch. 757,  was enacted on June 26, 1934, and currently codified and amended as . The law is an Act of Congress in the United States that, in general, imposes an excise tax on the manufacture and transfer of certain firearms and mandates the registration of those firearms. The NFA is also referred to as Title II of the federal firearms laws, with the Gun Control Act of 1968 ("GCA") as Title I.

All transfers of ownership of registered NFA firearms must be done through the National Firearms Registration and Transfer Record (the "NFA registry"). The NFA also requires that the permanent transport of NFA firearms across state lines by the owner must be reported to the Bureau of Alcohol, Tobacco, Firearms and Explosives (ATF). Temporary transports of some items, most notably suppressors (also referred to as silencers), do not need to be reported.

Background

The ostensible impetus for the National Firearms Act of 1934 was the gangland crime of the Prohibition era, such as the St. Valentine's Day Massacre of 1929, and the attempted assassination of President-elect Franklin D. Roosevelt in 1933. Like the current National Firearms Act (NFA), the 1934 Act required NFA firearms to be registered and taxed. The $200 tax was quite prohibitive at the time. With a few exceptions, the tax amount is unchanged.

Originally, pistols and revolvers were to be regulated as strictly as machine guns; towards that end, cutting down a rifle or shotgun to circumvent the handgun restrictions by making a concealable weapon was taxed as strictly as a machine gun.

Conventional pistols and revolvers were ultimately excluded from the Act before passage, but other concealable weapons were not. Regarding the definition of "firearm", the language of the statute as originally enacted was as follows:

The term "firearm" means a shotgun or rifle having a barrel of less than eighteen inches in length, or any other weapon, except a pistol or revolver, from which a shot is discharged by an explosive if such weapon is capable of being concealed on the person, or a machine gun, and includes a muffler or silencer for any firearm whether or not such firearm is included within the foregoing definition.

Under the original Act, NFA weapons were machine guns, short-barreled rifles (SBR), short-barreled shotguns (SBS), any other weapons (AOW, i.e., concealable weapons other than pistols or revolvers), and silencers for any type of NFA or non-NFA weapon. Minimum barrel length was soon amended to 16 inches for rimfire rifles and by 1960 had been amended to 16 inches for centerfire rifles as well.

NFA categories have been modified by laws passed by Congress, rulings by the Department of the Treasury, and regulations promulgated by the enforcement agency assigned, known as the Bureau of Alcohol, Tobacco, Firearms and Explosives or ATF.

Categories of regulated firearms

The National Firearms Act of 1934 (NFA) defines a number of categories of regulated firearms. These weapons are collectively known as NFA firearms and include the following:

Machine guns Includes any firearm which can fire repeatedly, without manual reloading, "by a single function of the trigger"; Both continuous fully automatic fire and "burst fire" (e.g., firearms with a 3-round burst feature) are considered machine gun features. The weapon's receiver is by itself considered to be a regulated firearm. A non-machine gun that may be converted to fire more than one shot per trigger pull by ordinary mechanical skills is determined to be "readily convertible", and classed as a machine gun, such as a KG-9 pistol (pre-ban examples are "grandfathered").

Short-barreled rifles (SBRs) Includes any firearm with a buttstock and either a rifled barrel less than 16" long or an overall length under 26". The overall length is measured with any folding or collapsing stocks in the extended position. The category also includes firearms which came from the factory with a buttstock that was later removed by a third party.

Short barreled shotguns (SBSs) Similarly to SBRs, but with either a smoothbore barrel less than 18" long or a minimum overall length under 26".

Suppressors The legal term for a suppressor is silencer, and includes any portable device designed to muffle or disguise the report of a portable firearm, but does not include non-portable devices, such as sound traps used by gunsmiths in their shops which are large and usually bolted to the floor.

Destructive devices (DDs) - (added to the NFA of 1934 by the Omnibus Crime Control and Safe Streets Act of 1968) There are two broad classes of destructive devices:

Any other weapon (AOW)  
Firearms meeting the definition of "any other weapon", or AOW, are weapons or devices that can be concealed on the person and from which a shot can be discharged by the energy of an explosive. Many AOWs are disguised devices such as pens, cigarette lighters, knives, cane guns, and umbrella guns. AOWs can be pistols and revolvers with smooth bore barrels (e.g., H&R Handy-Gun, Serbu Super-Shorty) designed or redesigned to fire a fixed shotgun shell. While the above weapons are similar in appearance to weapons made from shotguns, they were originally manufactured in the described configuration rather than modified from existing shotguns. As a result, such weapons do not fit within the definition of shotgun or weapons made from a shotgun.

The AOW definition includes specifically described weapons with combination shotgun and rifle barrels 12 inches or more but less than 18 inches in length from which only a single discharge can be made from either barrel without manual reloading.

The ATF Firearms Technology Branch has issued opinions that when a pistol (such as an AR-type pistol) under 26" in overall length is fitted with a vertical fore-grip, it is no longer "designed, made and intended to fire ... when held in one hand," and therefore no longer meets the definition of a pistol.  Such a firearm then falls only within the definition of "any other weapon" under the NFA.

In 1938, Congress recognized that the Marble Game Getter, a short .22/.410 sporting firearm, had "legitimate use" and did not deserve the stigma of a "gangster weapon" and reduced the $200 tax to one dollar for the Game Getter. In 1960 Congress changed the transfer tax for all AOW category firearms to $5. The transfer tax for machine guns, silencers, SBR and SBS remained at $200.

Parts associated with NFA items
In general, certain components that make up an NFA item are considered as regulated. For example, the components of a silencer are considered as "silencers" by themselves and the replacement parts are regulated. However, the repair of original parts without replacement can be done by the original manufacturer, FFL gunsmith, or by registered owner without being subjected to new registration as long as the serial number and the dimension (caliber) are maintained. The length may be reduced in repair, but cannot be increased. Increasing the length is considered as making a new silencer. "Suppressor" is the term used within the trade/industry literature while the term "silencer" is the commonly used term that appears in the actual wording of the NFA. The terms are often used interchangeably depending on the source quoted.

Suppressors and machine guns are the most heavily regulated. For example, in Ruling 81-4, ATF declared that any AR-15 Drop-in Auto-Sear (DIAS) made after November 1, 1981 is itself a machine gun, and is therefore subject to regulation. While this might seem to mean that pre-1981 sears are legal to possess without registration, ATF closes this loophole in other publications, stating,Regardless of the date of manufacture of a drop in auto sear, possession of such a sear and certain M-16 fire control parts is possession of a machine gun as defined by the NFA. Specifically, these parts are listed as "(a) combination(s) of parts" designed "Solely and exclusively" for use in converting a weapon into a machine gun and are a machine gun as defined in the NFA.ATF machine gun technology letters written between 1980 and 1996 by Edward M. Owen—the then-chief of the ATF technology division defined "solely and exclusively" in all of his published and unpublished machine gun rulings with specific non-ambiguous language.

Owning for the parts needed to assemble other NFA firearms is generally restricted. One individual cannot own or manufacture certain machine gun sear (fire-control) components, unless, he owns a registered machine gun. The M2 carbine trigger pack is such an example of a "combination of parts" that is a machine gun in and of itself. Most of these have been registered as they were pulled from stores of surplus rifles in the early 1960s. In some special cases, exceptions have been determined to these rules by ATF. A semiautomatic firearm which could have a string or shoelace looped around the cocking handle of and then behind and in front of the trigger in such a way as to allow the firearm to be fired automatically is no longer considered a machine gun unless the string is attached in this manner.

Most current fully automatic trigger groups will not fit their semi-automatic firearm look-alike counterparts—the semi-automatic version is specifically constructed to reject the fully automatic trigger group by adding metal in critical places. This addition is required by ATF to prevent easy conversion of Title I firearms into machine guns.

For the civilian possession, all machine guns must have been manufactured and registered with ATF prior to May 19, 1986, to be transferable between citizens. These machine gun prices have drastically escalated in value, especially items like registered sears and conversion-kits. Only a Class-II manufacturer (a FFL holder licensed to manufacture firearms or Type-07 license that has paid a Special Occupational Tax Stamp or SOT) could manufacture machine guns after that date, and they can only be sold to government, law-enforcement, and military entities. Transfer can only be done to other SOT FFL-holders, and such FFL-holders must have a "demonstration letter" from a respective government agency to receive such machine guns. Falsification and/or misuse of the "demo-letter" process can and has resulted in long jail sentences and felony convictions for violators.

Owning both a short barrel and a legal-length rifle could be construed as intent to build an illegal, unregistered SBR. This possibility was contested and won in the U.S. Supreme Court case of United States v. Thompson-Center Arms Company. ATF lost the case, and was unable to prove that possession of a short barrel for the specific pistol configuration of a Thompson Contender is illegal. ATF later released ruling 2011-4 to clarify the legal status of owning such conversion kits.

Removal of a weapon from classification as an NFA firearm, such as the reclassification of the original Broomhandle Mauser with shoulder stock from "short barrel rifle" (SBR) to a curio or relic handgun, changed its status as a Title II NFA firearm but did not change its status as a Title I Gun Control Act firearm.

Muzzle-loading firearms are exempt from the Act (as they are defined as "antique firearms" and are not considered "firearms" under either the GCA or the NFA). Thus, though common muzzle-loading hunting rifles are available in calibers over 0.50 inch, they are not regulated as destructive devices. Muzzle-loading cannon are similarly exempt since the law makes no distinction about the size of muzzle-loading weapons. Thus it is legal for a civilian to build muzzle-loading rifles, pistols, cannon, and mortars with no paperwork. However, ammunition for these weapons can still be classified as destructive devices themselves, such as explosive shells. While an 'antique firearm' is not considered a 'firearm' under the NFA, some states (such as Oregon) have laws that specifically prohibit anyone that could not otherwise own/obtain an GCA or NFA defined 'firearm' (i.e., felons, recipients of dishonorable discharge from military service, the mentally adjudicated, etc.) from owning/obtaining an 'antique firearm'.

Individuals or companies seeking to market large-bore firearms may apply to ATF for a "sporting clause exception". If granted, ATF acknowledges that the firearm has a legitimate sporting use and is therefore not a destructive device. Certain large safari rifle calibers, such as .585 Nyati and .577 Tyrannosaur, have such exceptions.

The phrase "all NFA rules apply" is commonplace. This disclaimer is usually posted in bold print from firearm dealers holding an FFL license.

Registration, purchases, taxes and transfers 

It is a common misconception that an individual must have a "Class 3" license in order to own an NFA weapon. A Federal Firearms License (FFL) is not required to be an individual owner, although it is required as a prerequisite to become a Special Occupation Taxpayer (SOT, see Special Occupational Taxpayers): Class 1 importer, Class 2 manufacturer-dealer or Class 3 dealer in NFA weapons. There are generally three ways to own an NFA weapon: as an individual, through a gun trust, or as a Limited Liability Company (LLC). Legal possession of an NFA firearm by an individual requires transfer of registration within the NFA registry. An individual owner does not need to be an NFA dealer to buy Title II weapons. The sale and purchase of an NFA weapon is, however, taxed and regulated, as follows:

All NFA items must be registered with the Bureau of Alcohol, Tobacco, Firearms and Explosives (ATF). Private owners wishing to purchase an NFA item must obtain approval from the ATF, pass an extensive background check to include submitting a photograph and fingerprints, fully register the firearm, receive ATF written permission before moving the firearm across state lines, and pay a tax. The request to transfer ownership of an NFA item is made on an ATF Form 4. There have been several unfavorable lawsuits where plaintiffs have been denied NFA approval for a transfer. These lawsuits include: Lomont v. O'Neill, Westfall v. Miller, and Steele v. National Branch.

NFA items may also be transferred to corporations (or other legal entities such as a trust). When the paperwork to request transfer of an NFA item is initiated by an officer of a corporation, fingerprint cards and photographs of the official need to be submitted with the transfer request.  This method has downsides, since it is the corporation (and not the principal) that owns the firearm. Thus, if the corporation dissolves, it must transfer its NFA weapon to the owners. This event would be considered a new transfer and would be subject to a new transfer tax.

The tax for privately manufacturing any NFA firearm (other than machine guns, which are illegal for individuals to manufacture) is $200. Transferring requires a $200 tax for all NFA weapons except AOWs, for which the transfer tax is $5 (although the manufacturing tax remains $200).

All NFA weapons made by individuals must be legal in the State or municipality where the individual lives. The payment of a $200 "making tax" prior to manufacture of the weapon, although a subsequent transfer of AOWs after they are legally "made" is only $5. Only a Class-II manufacturer (a FFL holder licensed as a "Manufacture of Firearms" or Type-07 license that has paid a Special Occupational Tax Stamp or SOT) can manufacture NFA firearms (other than destructive devices) tax free, but they pay a larger annual tax which ranges from $500 to $1000 to cover manufacturing.

A Destructive Device manufacturing license (Type-10 FFL) holder can manufacture destructive devices tax-free. However a type-07 license costs $150 for three years –– whereas a Type-10 destructive manufacturing license costs $3000 for three years. Both licenses still require the payment of the $500 (reduced-rate) Special Occupational Tax Stamp or SOT, (or the $1000 full tax) per year to conduct manufacturing of NFA weapons that they are respectively qualified to manufacturer. The SOT "reduced rate" applies to a business whose sales are less than $500,000 per year.

Transferable machine guns made or registered before May 19, 1986, are worth far more than their original, pre-1986 value and items like registered "auto-sears", "lightning-links", trigger-packs, trunnions, and other "combination of parts" registered as machine guns before the aforementioned date are often worth nearly as much as a full registered machine gun. For instance, as of September 2008, a transferable M16 rifle costs approximately $11,000 to $18,000, while a transferable "lightning-link" for the AR-15 can sell for $8,000 to $10,000. New manufacture M-16s sell to law enforcement and the military for around $600 to $1000.

Upon the request of any ATF agent or investigator, or the Attorney General, the registered owner must provide proof of registration of the firearm.

In a number of situations, an NFA item may be transferred without a transfer tax. These include sales to government agencies, temporary transfers of an NFA firearm to a gunsmith for repairs, and transfer of an NFA firearm to a lawful heir after the death of its owner. A permanent transfer, even if tax-free, must be approved by ATF. The proper form should be submitted to ATF before the transfer occurs. For example, lawful heirs must submit a Form 5 and wait for approval before taking possession of any NFA item willed to them. Temporary transfers, such as those to a gunsmith or to the original manufacturer for repair, are not subject to ATF approval since they are not legally considered transfers. ATF does, however, recommend filing tax-free transfer paperwork on all such temporary transfers, to confer an extra layer of legal protection on both the owner and the gunsmith.

Criminal conduct

The Act makes certain conduct a criminal offense, in relation to engaging in business as a manufacturer, importer, or dealer with respect to (NFA) firearms without having registered or paid a Special Occupational Tax (SOT); receiving or possessing a firearm transferred to oneself in violation of the NFA; receiving or possessing a firearm made in violation of the NFA; receiving or possessing a firearm not registered to oneself in the National Firearms Registration and Transfer Record; transferring or making a firearm in violation of the NFA; or obliterating, removing, changing, or altering the serial number of the firearm.

Criminal penalties

Violations of the Act are punishable by up to 10 years in federal prison and forfeiture of all devices or firearms in violation, and the individual's right to own or possess firearms in the future. The Act provides for a penalty of $10,000 for certain violations. A willful attempt to evade or defeat a tax imposed by the Act is a felony punishable by up to five years in prison and a $100,000 fine ($500,000 in the case of a corporation or trust), under the general tax evasion statute. For an individual, the felony fine of $100,000 for tax evasion could be increased to $250,000.

Exceptions

The United States Supreme Court has ruled in Haynes v. United States that the Fifth Amendment to the United States Constitution exempts felons—and, by extrapolation, all other prohibited possessors—from the registration requirements of the Act. The prohibited person who violates the possession prohibition can, however, be convicted under the Gun Control Act of 1968 for being a prohibited person in possession of a (any) firearm.

The Atomic Energy Act of 1954 was amended in 2005 and includes a provision (42 U.S.C. § 2201a) to allow Nuclear Regulatory Commission (NRC) licensees and authorized contractors to possess machine guns for the purpose of providing security.

The market for NFA items 

Importation of NFA firearms was banned by the 1968 Gun Control Act which implemented a "sporting" clause. Only firearms judged by ATF to have feasible sporting applications can be imported for civilian use. Licensed manufacturers of NFA firearms may still, with the proper paperwork, import foreign NFA firearms for research and development purposes, or for government use.

The domestic manufacture of new machine guns that civilians could purchase was effectively banned by language in the Firearm Owners Protection Act of 1986 (also known as "McClure-Volkmer"). The language was added in an amendment from William J. Hughes and referred to as the Hughes Amendment. Machine guns legally registered prior to the date of enactment (i.e. May 1986) are still legal for possession by and transfer among civilians where permitted by state law. The static and relatively small number of transferable machine guns has caused their price to rise, often over $10,000, although transferable Mac-10 and Mac-11 submachine guns can still be purchased for around $8,000. Machine guns manufactured after the FOPA's enactment can be sold only to law enforcement and government agencies, exported, or held as inventory or "dealer samples" by licensed manufacturers and dealers. Machine guns made after 1986 for law enforcement but not transferable to civilian registration are usually priced only a few hundred dollars more than their semi-automatic counterparts, whereas a pre-Hughes Amendment registered machine gun that can be legally transferred commands a huge premium.

The Hughes Amendment affected only machine guns. All other NFA firearms are still legal for manufacture and registration by civilians under Form 1, and transfer of registration to civilians via Form 4 (though some states have their own laws governing which NFA firearms are legal to own there). Silencers and Short Barreled Rifles are generally the most popular NFA firearms among civilians, followed by Short Barrel Shotguns, Destructive Devices, and "Any Other Weapons". While most NFA firearms are bought from manufacturers and transferred to civilians through a dealer, many are made by the civilians themselves after filing a Form 1 and paying the $200 tax. Some types of NFA firearms can be relatively simple to make, such as making a Short Barreled Rifle (by swapping out the upper receiver for one containing a short barrel) or a Short Barreled Shotgun by using a pipe cutter to shorten the barrel length, while making other NFA firearms, such as suppressors require more technical skill.

NFA trust 
An NFA trust (also known as a gun trust, Title II trust, ATF trust, or Class 3 trust) is a legal trust that is used in the United States to register and own NFA firearms.  Under regulations, use of a trust allows prospective purchasers of NFA items to avoid some of the federal transfer requirements that would otherwise be imposed on an individual. Like other trusts, it allows for estate planning in inheriting firearms. In 2013, ATF proposed new rules, often referred to as ATF Proposed Rule 41p, which, if adopted, would require all "responsible persons" of an entity being used to purchase NFA items to comply with the same procedures as individuals in obtaining NFA items.  In an NFA trust, a responsible person is defined as "any grantor, trustee, beneficiary, ... who possesses, directly or indirectly, the power or authority under any trust instrument, ... to receive, possess, ship, transport, deliver, transfer, or otherwise dispose of a firearm for, or on behalf of, the entity."  ATF finalized the rule on January 15, 2016, to become effective 180 days later. The previous requirement for "chief law enforcement officer" approval was eliminated, while all responsible people for a trust must now comply with the same restrictions as individual owners.

Miller case

In 1938, the United States District Court for the Western District of Arkansas ruled the statute unconstitutional in United States v. Miller. The defendant Miller had been arrested for possession of an unregistered short double-barreled shotgun, and for "unlawfully ... transporting [it] in interstate commerce from Claremore, Oklahoma to Siloam Springs, Arkansas" which perfected the crime. The government's argument was that the short barreled shotgun was not a military-type weapon and thus not a "militia" weapon protected by the Second Amendment, from federal infringement. The District Court agreed with Miller's argument that the shotgun was legal under the Second Amendment.

The District Court ruling was overturned on a direct appeal to the United States Supreme Court (see United States v. Miller). No brief was filed on behalf of the defendants, and the defendants themselves did not appear before the Supreme Court. Miller himself had been murdered one month prior to the Supreme Court's decision. No evidence that such a firearm was "ordinary military equipment" had been presented at the trial court (apparently because the case had been thrown out—at the defendants' request—before evidence could be presented), although two Supreme Court justices at the time had been United States Army officers during World War I and may have had personal knowledge of the use of such weapons in combat. The Supreme Court indicated it could not take judicial notice of such a contention.

The Supreme Court reversed the District Court and held that the NFA provision (criminalizing possession of certain firearms) was not in violation of the Second Amendment's restriction and therefore was constitutional.

Subsequent rulings have been allowed to stand, indicating that short-barreled shotguns are generally recognized as ordinary military equipment if briefs are filed (e.g., see: Cases v. United States), describing use of short-barreled shotguns in specialized military units.

See also
Firearm case law in the United States
Gun law in the United States
Gun politics in the United States
Uniform Firearms Act

Notes

External links
 ATF's National Firearms Act Handbook

1934 in American law
73rd United States Congress
Gun politics in the United States
United States federal criminal legislation
United States federal firearms legislation
United States federal privacy legislation
Presidency of Franklin D. Roosevelt